The Indian state of Bihar contains sub-Himalayan foothills and mountains with moist deciduous forests. Rainfall may exceed 1600 millimeters per year. Common trees include Shorea robusta (sal), Toona ciliata, Diospyros melanoxylon (kendu), Boswellia serrata (salai), Terminalia tomentosa (asan), Terminalia bellirica (bahera), Terminalia arjuna (arjun), Pterocarpus marsupium (paisar), Madhuca indica (mahua).

Plants of Bihar include:

 Holarrhena antidysenterica
 Flemingia chappar
 Ziziphus xylopyrus
 Bauhinia vahlii
 Smilex protifrera
 Butea superba
 Butea parviflora

See also
 Fauna of Bihar
 Flora of India
 Fauna of India
 Protected areas of Bihar

References

External links
 Official Bihar Department of the Environment and Forests website
Hooker, J. D. Flora of British India Volume 1
Hooker, J. D. Flora of British India Volume 2
Hooker, J. D. Flora of British India Volume 3
Hooker, J. D. Flora of British India Volume 4
Hooker, J. D. Flora of British India Volume 5
Hooker, J. D. Flora of British India Volume 6

 
.
Bihar
Tourism in Bihar